A26 or A-26 may refer to:

Roads
 List of A26 roads

Transportation
 Douglas A-26 Invader, a light attack bomber built by Douglas
 Aero A.26, a Czech reconnaissance aircraft of the 1920s
 Focke-Wulf A 26, a German Focke-Wulf aircraft
 Blekinge-class submarine, also known as the A26 submarine, the next generation of Swedish submarines equipped with stirling engines
 The FAA location identifier for Adin Airport

Other uses
 HLA-A26, an HLA-A serotype
 The English Opening, in the Encyclopaedia of Chess Openings
 The file extension for Starpath Supercharger cassette images